Abir Muhaisen (born 1973) was adopted by King Hussein of Jordan and his third wife, Queen Alia, after Muhaisen's biological mother was killed by a plane crash at a Palestinian refugee camp in Amman, Jordan in 1976. 

Muhaisen was educated in the United States. She briefly attended Garrison Forest School, a boarding school in Maryland, before graduating from Oldfields School in Glencoe, Maryland in 1991. She earned a Bachelor of Arts degree in Elementary Education from American University, and a Master of Arts in Sports Management and Physical Education from Virginia Commonwealth University.

References 

 Queen Noor (2003) Leap of Faith: Memoirs of an Unexpected Life, Miramax Books, 

1973 births
Living people
Jordanian adoptees
American University alumni
Virginia Commonwealth University alumni
Daughters of kings